Klaus Rifbjerg's Debutant Prize (Danish: Klaus Rifbjergs debutantpris for lyrik) was founded in 1983 by Danish author Klaus Rifbjerg, it is awarded every second year to a poet debutant, who has published his or her first collection with poems within the last two years. The poems must be written in one of the three main languages of the Danish Kingdom: Danish, Faroese or Greenlandic.

Receipients of the Klaus Rifbjerg Debutant Prize 

 2020 Molly Balsby
 2018 Theresa Salomonsen
 2016 Theis Ørntoft
 2014 Asta Olivia Nordenhof
 2012 Sissal Kampmann
 2010 Eva Tind Kristensen
 2008 Morten Søkilde
 2006 Dy Plambeck
 2004 Lars Skinnebach
 2002 Martin Larsen
 2000 Øverste Kirurgiske
 1998 Mikkel Thykier
 1996 Katrine Marie Guldager
 1994 Kirsten Hammann
 1992 Lene Henningsen
 1990 Karen Marie Edelfeldt
 1988 Lars Bukdahl
 1986 Morti Vizki
 1984 Juliane Preisler

References 

Danish literary awards
First book awards
1983 establishments in Denmark